Denzel Leslie Clarke (born May 1, 2000) is a Canadian professional baseball outfielder in the Oakland Athletics organization.

Clarke attended Everest Academy in Thornhill, Ontario, Canada. He was drafted by the New York Mets in the 36th round of the 2018 Major League Baseball Draft, but did not sign and played college baseball at California State University, Northridge. After three years at Northridge, he was drafted by the Oakland Athletics in the fourth round of the 2021 MLB Draft and signed.

Clarke made his professional debut with the Arizona Complex League Athletics. He started 2022 with the Stockton Ports before being promoted to the Lansing Lugnuts. In July, he was selected to play in the All-Star Futures Game.

References

External links

2000 births
Living people
Baseball people from Ontario
Canadian expatriate baseball players in the United States
Cal State Northridge Matadors baseball players
Arizona Complex League Athletics players
Stockton Ports players
Lansing Lugnuts players
Mesa Solar Sox players
Black Canadian baseball players
2023 World Baseball Classic players